The Dibër County is a county in northeastern Albania, with the capital in Peshkopi. The county spans  and had a total population of 134,153 people as of 2016. The county borders on the counties of Durrës, Elbasan, Kukës, Lezhë, Tirana, and North Macedonia.

Dibër County is predominantly mountainous and framed by mountain ranges. The mountain ranges extend the length of the county from north to south, including the Korab Mountains in the east, the Dejë Mountain in the center, the Lura Mountains in the east and the Skanderbeg Mountains in the west.

List of mountains in Dibër County

See also 
 Dibër County
 Geography of Albania
 Mountains of Albania

References